Nellie Verrill Mighels Davis (née Verrill) (September 10, 1844 – June 24, 1945) was a US civic leader and journalist. In 1897, she was the first woman to report a boxing prize fight (Fitzsimmons/Corbett) in the United States. She was also the first State President of the American Red Cross in Nevada, and an officer of the Pacific Coast Women's Press Association

Biography
Nellie Verrill was born in Greenwood, Maine, September 10, 1844. In 1866, she married first Henry Rust Mighels, owner and editor of the Carson City Nevada Appeal.  They had three sons and two daughters.  In 1877 and 1879, Davis was the first woman to report on the state Legislature, which is located in Carson City. Their son, Henry R. Mighels Jr., eventually took over as editor of the Appeal in 1898. Ella Sterling Mighels, ex-wife of their son Philip, was the "First Literary Historian of California".

Widowed at the age of 35, she hired Samuel Post Davis, of the Virginia Chronicle to be her editor and she served in the role of publisher.  She married Davis in 1880, and he took over operations of the Nevada Appeal. They had two daughters. In 1897, she was the first woman to report a prize fight (Fitzsimmons/Corbett); Nevada, at the time, being the only state in the US where prize fighting was legal. She was also the organizer and first State President of the American Red Cross in Nevada. She was buried at Lone Mountain Cemetery in Carson City between her two husbands.

References

1844 births
1945 deaths
Writers from Maine
American newspaper reporters and correspondents
People from Carson City, Nevada
People from Greenwood, Maine
American women journalists
American centenarians
Victorian writers
19th-century American women writers
19th-century American writers
19th-century American newspaper publishers (people)
Journalists from Nevada
Journalists from Maine
Women centenarians
Pacific Coast Women's Press Association